POS Solutions is an Australian company that provides software and services to small and medium businesses. The company's software is the market leader in Australian newsagencies. Its product and services range from entry-level software to multi-user enterprise software for retail point of sale software or retail POS.

See also
Comparison of accounting software
Point of Sale Malware

References

External links 

https://www.possolutions.com.au/

Point of sale companies
Retail point of sale systems
Business software
Software companies of Australia
Accounting software
Companies established in 1983
Companies based in Melbourne